The 1987–88 Fairleigh Dickinson Knights men's basketball team represented Fairleigh Dickinson University during the 1987–88 NCAA Division I men's basketball season. The team was led by fifth-year head coach Tom Green. The Knights played their home games at the FDU Gym in Hackensack, New Jersey as members of the ECAC Metro Conference.

The Knights compiled a 23–7 record and went 13–3 in ECAC Metro play to win the regular season conference title. They defeated Saint Francis (PA), Long Island University, and Monmouth to capture the ECAC Metro tournament championship. By winning the ECAC Metro tournament, the Knights received the conference's automatic bid to the NCAA tournament as No. 16 seed in the Midwest region. The Knights put up a fight but fell to 1-seed Purdue, 94–79, in the opening round.

Roster

Schedule and results

|- 
!colspan=9 style=| Regular season  

|-
!colspan=9 style=| ECAC Metro tournament

|-
!colspan=9 style=| NCAA tournament

References

Fairleigh Dickinson Knights men's basketball seasons
Fairleigh Dickinson
Fairleigh Dickinson
Fairleigh Dickinson
Fairleigh Dickinson